Radio DDR 1 was a radio channel produced and transmitted by Rundfunk der DDR, the radio broadcasting organization of East Germany (GDR). It had a mixed schedule of news and light entertainment, with the emphasis on events in the GDR, and also included regional programming.

History
Radio DDR 1 was established in August 1953 when, as part of a reorganization of the broadcasting system, it joined the existing stations Deutschlandsender (part of Rundfunk der DDR since 1949) and Berliner Rundfunk (founded in 1946). Between June 1954 and September 1955, it was known as Berlin zweites Programm (Berlin 2nd Programme) in distinction from Berlin erstes Programm (Berlin 1st Programme), the new name for Berliner Rundfunk.

The channel, which was transmitted on medium wave (531, 558, 576, 603, 729, 882, and 1044 kHz) and FM, broadcast until 1990. In April of that year it was renamed "Radio aktuell" and carried advertising for the first time.

Following German reunification, Radio aktuell's frequencies were transferred to the new public-service broadcasting organizations Mitteldeutscher Rundfunk (covering Saxony, Saxony-Anhalt, and Thuringia) and Ostdeutscher Rundfunk Brandenburg, and to the Hamburg-based Norddeutscher Rundfunk which took over as public-service broadcaster in Mecklenburg-Vorpommern.

Programmes
The weekly Schlagerrevue, which ran for 36 years and was presented from 1958 by Heinz Quermann, became the world's longest-running radio hit parade. The programme's editor from 1963 to 1988 was the composer, lyricist, arranger, singer, and bandleader Siegfried Jordan.

Radio DDR 1's Sports Department employed such well known journalists as Heinz-Florian Oertel, Hubert Knobloch, Wolfgang Hempel, and Waldefried Forkefeld.

See also
Eastern Bloc information dissemination

Mass media in East Germany
Defunct radio stations in East Germany
Radio stations established in 1953
Radio stations disestablished in 1991
1953 establishments in East Germany
1991 disestablishments in Germany